The following television stations broadcast on digital channel 12 in Mexico:

 Azteca Uno in Matamoros, Tamaulipas

12